Lawrence Ivor "Jack" Pearson (25 January 1922 – 1 October 2007) was an English cricketer who played first-class cricket for Derbyshire County Cricket Club in 1946.

Pearson was born at Darnall, Sheffield. He began playing for Derbyshire in July 1945 before the County Championship came back after the Second World War. He made his debut for Derbyshire in the 1946 season in a match against Glamorgan in August. He played one more first-class match in the same month which was his last for Derbyshire.

Pearson was a left-handed batsman who played four innings in two first-class matches with an average of 6.00 and a top score of 18.

Pearson died at the age of 85 at Sutton-in-Ashfield, Nottinghamshire.

References

1922 births
English cricketers
2007 deaths
Derbyshire cricketers
People from Darnall